The 1993 Alabama Crimson Tide football team represented the University of Alabama for the 1993 NCAA Division I-A football season, competing in the Southeastern Conference Western Division. The team was led by head coach Gene Stallings, who was in his fourth season at the position.

Alabama entered the season as the defending national champion, following their victory in the 1993 Sugar Bowl, and ranked #2 in the AP Poll, behind Florida State.

Alabama won the first five games of the season, extending their winning streak to 28 games, matching the longest win streak in school history. The streak ended with a 17–17 tie against Tennessee.  The unbeaten streak continued to 31 games before Alabama fell to LSU, 17–13.

Alabama finished second in the SEC West in 1993, but played in the SEC Championship Game as Auburn was prohibited from post-season play because of NCAA violations. In the SEC Championship Game, Alabama lost 28–13 to the Florida Gators at Legion Field. Alabama received an invitation to the Gator Bowl versus North Carolina, winning 24–10 and finishing with a 9–3–1 record.

In 1995, the NCAA found Antonio Langham guilty of receiving improper benefits after signing with an agent following the 1992 season, forcing Alabama to forfeit all games in which Langham competed. Officially, Alabama finished the season with a 1–12 record, only winning their bowl game.

Schedule

Roster

Regular season statistics

Team

Quarter-by-quarter statistics

Scoring

Time of possession

Passing

References

Alabama
Alabama Crimson Tide football seasons
Gator Bowl champion seasons
Alabama Crimson Tide football